Alexandre Lauray (born 18 March 1997) is a French professional footballer who plays as centre-back for  club Le Mans.

Club career
Lauray joined the youth academy of Toulouse FC in 2011, and moved to Bordeaux in 2018. Lauray made his senior debut with Bordeaux in a 3–0 Ligue 1 loss to AS Saint-Étienne on 14 April 2019. In July 2019 he signed his first professional contract, for three years, with Bordeaux, and subsequently joined USL Dunkerque on loan until the end of the 2019–20 season. In September 2020 he was loaned to Villefranche for the 2020–21 season.

On 9 August 2021, he signed with Le Mans. He suffered a serious injury in a friendly in July 2022, sidelining him for an extended period.

References

External links

1997 births
Living people
People from Les Sables-d'Olonne
Association football defenders
French footballers
Ligue 1 players
Championnat National players
Championnat National 2 players
Championnat National 3 players
FC Girondins de Bordeaux players
USL Dunkerque players
FC Villefranche Beaujolais players
Le Mans FC players
Sportspeople from Vendée
Footballers from Pays de la Loire